The Movimiento Scout del Uruguay (MSU) is the national Scouting organization of Uruguay, and a member of the World Organization of the Scout Movement. Scouting was founded in Uruguay in 1947 and became a member of WOSM in 1950. MSU has 1,549 members (as of 2011).

Asociación Scouts del Uruguay (ASU, Scout Association of Uruguay) and Asociación de Scouts Católicos del Uruguay (ASCU, Catholic Scouts of Uruguay) merged to form the Movimento Scout del Uruguay in 1994.

Program 
Scouts are active in community service and step in to help the government in times of disaster or special need.

Branches 
The association is divided into four branches:
 Lobatos (Cub Scouts)-ages 8 to 10
 Scouts-ages 11 to 13
 Pioneros (Pioneers)-ages 14 to 16
 Rovers-ages 17 to 19

Scout Law

Scout Oath

Scout Motto
Siempre Listo, Always ready

See also
 Scouting and Guiding in Uruguay
 Asociación Guías Scout del Uruguay

References

External links 
 Official MSU Homepage
 Official Grupo Scout Fortaleza Homepage - Spanish Version

World Organization of the Scout Movement member organizations
Scouting and Guiding in Uruguay
Youth organizations established in 1947
Youth organizations established in 1994
1947 establishments in Uruguay
1994 establishments in Uruguay